Ottó Szelky (1895 – 21 July 1929) was a Hungarian wrestler. He competed in the Greco-Roman heavyweight event at the 1924 Summer Olympics. He won four national championships between 1919 and 1927.

References

External links
 

1895 births
1929 deaths
Olympic wrestlers of Hungary
Wrestlers at the 1924 Summer Olympics
Hungarian male sport wrestlers
Place of birth missing